In number theory, a nontotient is a positive integer n which is not a totient number: it is not in the range of  Euler's totient function φ, that is, the equation φ(x) = n has no solution x. In other words, n is a nontotient if there is no integer x that has exactly n coprimes below it. All odd numbers are nontotients, except 1, since it has the solutions x = 1 and x = 2. The first few even nontotients are

14, 26, 34, 38, 50, 62, 68, 74, 76, 86, 90, 94, 98, 114, 118, 122, 124, 134, 142, 146, 152, 154, 158, 170, 174, 182, 186, 188, 194, 202, 206, 214, 218, 230, 234, 236, 242, 244, 246, 248, 254, 258, 266, 274, 278, 284, 286, 290, 298, ... 

Least k such that the totient of k is n are (0 if no such k exists)
1, 3, 0, 5, 0, 7, 0, 15, 0, 11, 0, 13, 0, 0, 0, 17, 0, 19, 0, 25, 0, 23, 0, 35, 0, 0, 0, 29, 0, 31, 0, 51, 0, 0, 0, 37, 0, 0, 0, 41, 0, 43, 0, 69, 0, 47, 0, 65, 0, 0, 0, 53, 0, 81, 0, 87, 0, 59, 0, 61, 0, 0, 0, 85, 0, 67, 0, 0, 0, 71, 0, 73, ... 

Greatest k such that the totient of k is n are (0 if no such k exists)
2, 6, 0, 12, 0, 18, 0, 30, 0, 22, 0, 42, 0, 0, 0, 60, 0, 54, 0, 66, 0, 46, 0, 90, 0, 0, 0, 58, 0, 62, 0, 120, 0, 0, 0, 126, 0, 0, 0, 150, 0, 98, 0, 138, 0, 94, 0, 210, 0, 0, 0, 106, 0, 162, 0, 174, 0, 118, 0, 198, 0, 0, 0, 240, 0, 134, 0, 0, 0, 142, 0, 270, ... 

Number of ks such that φ(k) = n are (start with n = 0)
0, 2, 3, 0, 4, 0, 4, 0, 5, 0, 2, 0, 6, 0, 0, 0, 6, 0, 4, 0, 5, 0, 2, 0, 10, 0, 0, 0, 2, 0, 2, 0, 7, 0, 0, 0, 8, 0, 0, 0, 9, 0, 4, 0, 3, 0, 2, 0, 11, 0, 0, 0, 2, 0, 2, 0, 3, 0, 2, 0, 9, 0, 0, 0, 8, 0, 2, 0, 0, 0, 2, 0, 17, ... 
According to Carmichael's conjecture there are no 1's in this sequence.

An even nontotient may be one more than a prime number, but never one less, since all numbers below a prime number are, by definition, coprime to it. To put it algebraically, for p prime: φ(p) = p − 1. Also, a pronic number n(n − 1) is certainly not a nontotient if n is prime since φ(p2) = p(p − 1).

If a natural number n is a totient, it can be shown that n · 2k is a totient for all natural number k.

There are infinitely many even nontotient numbers: indeed, there are infinitely many distinct primes p (such as 78557 and 271129, see Sierpinski number) such that all numbers of the form 2ap are nontotient, and every odd number has an even multiple which is a nontotient.

References

 
 L. Havelock, A Few Observations on Totient and Cototient Valence from PlanetMath
 
 

Integer sequences